Basile Khoury, BS (15 August 1900, Borj-Safita, today Syria – 22 April 1985) was the first Archeparch of the Melkite Greek Catholic Archeparchy of Sidon in Lebanon.

Life
Basile Khoury was ordained priest on May 2, 1928 and became Chaplain of the Melkite Basilian from the Holy Redeemer (BS). He was named to the Eparchy of Sidon, being appointed on 15 March 1947 at 25 March 1947 ordained to the episcopate. At the beginning of the 1960s during his tenure and under his patronage was erected a hexagonal chapel in Maghdouché, a Lebanese pilgrimage center, and this chapel had 28 meter high with a statue of "Our Lady of Mantara". Khoury was a Council Father during the first and second sessions of the Second Vatican Council (1962-1965).

On November 18, 1964, the Eparchy of Sidon was elevated to Archeparchy by Pope Paul VI and Khoury was appointed Archbishop of Sidon. On 30 July 1965 he was co-consecrator of the Archbishop Georges Haddad. On reaching the age limit, he was, at the same time appointed with 77 years on August 25, 1977 Titular Bishop of Myra of Greek Melkites and until his death on April 22, 1985 became Archbishop Emeritus of Sidon.

References

External links
 Catholic-hierarchy.org

1900 births
1985 deaths
Melkite Greek Catholic bishops
Syrian archbishops